Krępiel (also: Krąpiel) is a river of Poland. It is a tributary of the Ina, which it joins at Stargard Szczeciński.

Rivers of Poland
Rivers of West Pomeranian Voivodeship